The Republic of Indonesia, the world's fourth most populous country, holds significant diplomatic weight in Southeast Asia (as the seat of the Association of Southeast Asian Nations), the Non-Aligned Movement, and within the Islamic world as the most populous Muslim majority country. As such, it possesses a vast network of embassies, consulates, and permanent missions to international organizations.

Excluded from this listing are honorary consulates and trade missions, with the exception of the economic and trade office in Taipei, which serves as its de facto embassy to Taiwan.

Current missions

Africa

Americas

Asia

Europe

Oceania

Multilateral organizations

Closed missions

Africa

Asia

Europe

See also

 Foreign relations of Indonesia
 List of Indonesian ambassadors
 List of diplomatic missions in Indonesia
 Visa policy of Indonesia

Notes

References

External links

 Ministry of Foreign Affairs of the Republic of Indonesia

 
Diplomatic missions
Indonesia